Singkhon Pass, also referred to as Sing Khon and as Maw Daung after the name of the Burmese town west of the border, is a pass across the Tenasserim Hills on the border between Thailand and Myanmar, at an elevation of . The pass is close to the narrowest point of Thailand in Khlong Wan (คลองวาฬ) subdistrict, Mueang Prachuap Khiri Khan District, Prachuap Khiri Khan Province.

History 
Singkhon pass was important during the wars between Siam and the Burmese, and also during World War II, when the Mergui Road was constructed by the Japanese invaders.

The road on the Burmese side leads to Myeik – via Mawdaung and Tanintharyi – and has been recently been repaired. Singkhon Pass has been upgraded since late-2014 with improved public utilities, urban planning, and landscaping.

The official inauguration ceremony of the border crossing took place on 23 May 2015 with a crowd of about 2000 from both sides of the border attending the event.

Tourism
The Singkhon Pass border checkpoint is currently also being developed as a tourist attraction with new shops opening in the area by the road on the Thai side. It is also a place whereby traffic from one side of the road must change over to drive on the opposite side of the road.

References

External links

Singkhon Pass Border Market - TripAdvisor
Tourism - Prachuap Khiri Khan 

Tenasserim Hills
Mountain passes of Thailand
Mountain passes of Myanmar
Myanmar–Thailand border crossings
Geography of Prachuap Khiri Khan province